Atalanta Bergamasca Calcio, commonly referred to as Atalanta, is a professional football club based in Bergamo, Lombardy, Italy. The club plays in Serie A, having gained promotion from Serie B in 2010–11.

Atalanta was founded in 1907 by Liceo Classico Paolo Sarpi students and is nicknamed La Dea, the Nerazzurri and the Orobici. The club plays in blue-and-black vertically striped shirts, black shorts and black socks. The club plays its home matches at the 21,747-seater Gewiss Stadium. In Italy, Atalanta is sometimes called Regina delle provinciali (queen of the provincial clubs) to mark the fact that the club is the most consistent among Italian clubs not based in a regional capital, having played 62 in Serie A, 28 seasons in Serie B, and only one in Serie C. Atalanta has a long-standing rivalry with nearby club Brescia.

The club is also famed for its youth academy, which has produced several notable talents who have played in the top leagues of Europe. 

The club won the Coppa Italia in 1963 and reached the semi-finals of the Cup Winners' Cup in 1988, when it was competing in Serie B. This is still the best-ever performance by a non-first division club in a major UEFA competition (together with Cardiff City). Atalanta also participated in five seasons of the UEFA Europa League (previously known as the UEFA Cup), reaching the quarter-finals in 1991 and in 2022. Atalanta additionally qualified for the UEFA Champions League three times, reaching the quarter-finals in 2020.

History

Founding and establishment in Serie A (1907–1959)

Atalanta was founded on 17 October 1907 by students of the Liceo Classico Paolo Sarpi and was named after the female athlete of the same name from Greek mythology. Though it immediately established a football sector, it was not the first football association based in Bergamo: Football Club Bergamo was founded by Swiss emigrants in 1904, and was absorbed into another club, Bergamasca, in 1911. The Italian Football Federation did not recognize Atalanta until 1914, and in 1919 announced that it would only allow one club from Bergamo to compete in the highest national league (then called the Prima Categoria). As Atalanta and Bergamasca were rivals and did not come to an agreement, admission to the Prima Categoria was decided by a playoff match; Atalanta won this match 2–0. A merger between the two clubs nevertheless occurred in 1920, forming the new club Atalanta Bergamasca di Ginnastica e Scherma 1907 (shortened to Atalanta Bergamasca Calcio) and establishing its black and blue (nerazzurri) colors.

Atalanta competed in the Seconda Divisione, the second tier, during the early 1920s. In the 1927–28 season, the club won its group and subsequently defeated Pistoiese in the playoffs to win promotion and its first second division league triumph. The club inaugurated its current home stadium in the Borgo Santa Caterina neighborhood in 1928, and was admitted to Serie B, the second tier of the restructured Italian league, in 1929. After almost a decade in Serie B, Atalanta achieved its first promotion to Serie A in 1937 under coach Ottavio Barbieri, though was relegated at the end of the season. The club returned to Serie A in 1940 as champion of Serie B.

During the 1940s, Atalanta performed consistently in the top flight, though the national league was halted between 1943 and 1945 due to World War II. Atalanta achieved a fifth-place finish in the 1947–48 Serie A under coach Ivo Fiorentini, its highest league finish until 2017. The club earned a reputation as the provinciale terribile (terrible provincial team) during this time as a result of its successes against well-known metropolitan teams such as the Grande Torino, who won Serie A five times during the 1940s. Atalanta achieved mid-table finishes during much of the 1950s and remained in Serie A until 1958, when it was relegated due to accusations of match fixing. These accusations were found to be false a year later, after the club returned to Serie A by winning its second Serie B title.

Coppa Italia victory, decline, and reemergence in Europe (1959–1994)

Atalanta won the Coppa Italia in 1963, defeating Torino 3–1 in the final thanks to a hat-trick by striker Angelo Domenghini. This was the senior team's first (and so far only) major trophy. During the early 1960s, the club made its debut in European competitions, among them the 1961–62 Mitropa Cup, the Coppa dell'Amicizia, and the Coppa delle Alpi. As domestic cup winners, the club qualified for the 1963–64 European Cup Winners' Cup, its first major UEFA competition, though was eliminated by Portuguese club Sporting CP in the first round. The club made a few more appearances in international (though not UEFA) cups during the 1960s, though was relegated in 1969 after a decade in the top flight.

During the 1970s, Atalanta experienced several movements between Serie A and Serie B, and was in the second tier for four consecutive seasons between 1973 and 1977. Despite playing in Serie B at the time, the club developed several young players who moved on to historically bigger clubs and won the 1982 FIFA World Cup with Italy. Several difficult seasons then saw Atalanta fall into Serie B in 1980 and Serie C1 in 1981, when for the first time in its history, the club would play outside the top two tiers. This was a blow that revitalized the club, from which many changes in management followed. 

Under new management, Atalanta comfortably won Group A of Serie C1 in 1982, returning to Serie B the next season and then to Serie A in 1984, where it would remain until 1987. Atalanta reached its second Coppa Italia final in 1987, though lost 4–0 to Napoli over two legs. As Napoli also won Serie A that season and therefore qualified for the European Cup, Atalanta qualified for its second European Cup Winners' Cup. This was a turning point for the club; Emiliano Mondonico was appointed as coach and the club would achieve promotion after only one season in Serie B. In the Cup Winners' Cup, Atalanta lost its first match against Welsh club Merthyr Tydfil, but won the return fixture and went on to reach the semi-finals, where it would be eliminated 4–2 on aggregate by Belgian club K.V. Mechelen, who would eventually win the tournament. In doing so, Atalanta achieved the best finish in a UEFA competition of a club playing outside its country's top flight league. With a sixth-place finish in the 1988–89 Serie A, Atalanta qualified for its first UEFA Cup, though was eliminated by Russian club Spartak Moscow in the first round. Atalanta then finished seventh in the 1989–90 Serie A and reached the quarterfinals of the 1990–91 UEFA Cup, losing to local rival and eventual winner Internazionale.

Fluctuating performances (1994–2016)
After several upper mid-table finishes and a narrowly missed UEFA cup qualification in 1993, the club was relegated in 1994 after several investments to raise the club's goals failed, though would return to Serie A in 1995. In the 1995–96 season, Atalanta reached the Coppa Italia final again, losing against Fiorentina. In 1996–97 season, striker Filippo Inzaghi scored 24 league goals and became the first (and so far only) Atalanta player to be named capocannoniere (Serie A top scorer). The club then sold several key players, causing it to struggle and return to Serie B in 1998; it would remain there until 2000, when coach Giovanni Vavassori revitalized the team with youth academy players in a successful promotion campaign.

In the 2000s, Atalanta experienced more divisional movements: it was relegated in 2002–03 (despite finishing seventh two years prior) and 2004–05, but achieved promotion to Serie A after only one season in Serie B both times, winning the 2005–06 edition. After a tumultuous 2009–10 season, which saw the club change coach three times, the club was once again relegated; after this relegation, entrepreneur Antonio Percassi became the club's new president. and Stefano Colantuono returned as coach. The club won Serie B in 2011 and thus immediately returned to Serie A. Despite this success, club captain Cristiano Doni was named among the suspects in a match-fixing scandal (also known as Calcioscommesse); Doni was handed a three-and-a-half-year ban from football and the club was docked six points in the 2011–12 league table and two points in the 2012–13 league table. Throughout the early and mid-2010s, Atalanta generally lingered in lower-midtable in Serie A.

New heights under Gasperini (2016–present)

Former Genoa coach Gian Piero Gasperini was appointed before the 2016–17 season. Despite initial difficulties, the club's results steadily improved throughout the season. Gasperini integrated players from the club's youth sector and led the club to a fourth-place league finish with 72 points, besting its previous records and qualifying for the 2017–18 UEFA Europa League after a 26-year absence from UEFA competitions. In the Europa League, the club reached the round of 32, losing 4–3 on aggregate to Borussia Dortmund. In 2017–18, Atalanta finished seventh in the league, entering the qualifying rounds for 2018–19 UEFA Europa League, though was eliminated in a penalty shootout by Danish club Copenhagen. Despite a difficult start to the 2018–19 season, Atalanta achieved many positive results and finished third in Serie A, its best ever league finish; with this result, the club qualified for the UEFA Champions League group stage for the first time in its history. Atalanta also reached the Coppa Italia final, though lost 2–0 to Lazio.

In the 2019–20 season, Atalanta lost its first three Champions League matches, but went on to qualify for the round of 16. Atalanta then defeated Spanish club Valencia in both legs of the round of 16, reaching the quarterfinals, where it would be eliminated by French champions Paris Saint-Germain. The club also repeated its third-place finish in Serie A and achieved a second consecutive Champions League qualification, breaking several club records. In the 2020–21 season, Atalanta reached the round of 16 in the Champions League for the second time, following an away victory over Ajax, and later secured Champions League qualification and third place in Serie A for the third consecutive time.

On 19 February 2022, a U.S. based consortium led by Stephen Pagliuca acquired a 55% stake of La Dea srl, the controlling company of Atalanta, previously wholly owned by the Percassi family. Under the new agreement, Pagliuca was named co-chairman, with Antonio Percassi staying on as chairman.

In the year of 2022，Atalanta B.C announced a strategic partnership agreement with LEYU.
And LEYU SPORT became Official Regional Sponsor of Atalanta B.C. in Asia.

Colours, kits, and crest

Colours and kits

The first kits adopted by Atalanta after its founding featured thin black and white vertical stripes. These were Atalanta's colours until 1920, when the club merged with local rival Bergamasca (which had blue and white kits) in order to compete in the Italian league. Following the merger, the common colour white was eliminated, leaving black and blue (nerazzurri) as the colours of the newly-formed Atalanta Bergamasca Calcio. In the first years following this merger, the club's kits featured black and blue quarters. Atalanta adopted its classic black and blue vertical stripes several years later.

Atalanta's home kits have characteristically had black and blue vertical stripes since their adoption in the 1920s. Slight variations in thickness of the stripes have existed over the years, though the club never strayed far from the classic design for its home kits. Atalanta's away kits have traditionally been mostly white, with various touches of black and blue and other details. The club's third kits and goalkeeper kits have not historically adhered to any strict pattern; many colours (among them green, red, light blue, and black) have been used for these over the years.

Since 2010, Atalanta plays its final home match of the calendar year, a "Christmas Match", in specially designed kits. The kits are then auctioned to raise money for charity.

Kit suppliers and shirt sponsors

Crest
Atalanta has had five crests since its foundation, all of which depict some combination of the team's name (except between 1984 and 1993), colours, and (since 1963) the Greek mythological athlete Atalanta, from whom the club derives its name as well as its nickname La Dea.

The club's first three crests were shields featuring the name Atalanta on top, coloured stripes on the left, and another symbolic representation on the right. The original crest dates back to 1907 and had the club's original black and white stripes alongside a blue patch. In 1963, after the club won the Coppa Italia, the crest was redesigned to feature black and blue stripes alongside a running girl representing Atalanta. The crest's colours and representation of Atalanta changed again in the 1970s, though followed the same basic shape as the 1963 version.

In 1984, the crest underwent a major redesign: the club's name and the running girl's body were removed from the crest and its shape was changed from a shield to a circle. This "classic" crest featured a white silhouette of Atalanta's head on a black and blue background, enclosed in three concentric white, black, and golden yellow circles. Black, blue, and white were retained—as the club's colours—while yellow was added to represent the golden apples, which according to mythology, Hippomenes tossed to Atalanta to distract her and defeat her in a footrace.

The club's modern crest was designed in 1993. It incorporates the 1984 crest into its design, though tilts Atalanta's head and lacks the yellow circle. The name Atalanta and founding year 1907 were added respectively above and below the circle, which is enclosed in an ellipse featuring the same split black and blue background as the 1984 design.

Stadium

Atalanta has played at its current stadium, the 21,747-seater Gewiss Stadium in the Borgo Santa Caterina neighborhood of Bergamo, since 1928. Prior to its opening, Atalanta played at several other grounds in Bergamo. Between its founding in 1907 and recognition by the FIGC in 1914, the club did not have a dedicated playing field and only played friendly matches in public spaces—the Piazza d'Armi and the Campo di Marte in Bergamo. In 1914, Atalanta's first playing field was established on the Via Maglio del Lotto, near the Bergamo–Milan railway. It measured  and had a seated capacity of 1,000 spectators. Due to financial hardship during World War I, though, Atalanta was forced to sell the land containing its field, leaving it without a home ground. As a solution, entrepreneur and philanthropist Betty Ambiveri sold the Clementina field, an older venue in Seriate that hosted sporting events such as cycling, to the club. The new field was inaugurated as the Atalanta Stadium and it hosted 14,000 spectators in its first match against La Dominante of Genoa.

With the growth of football in the 1920s, Atalanta needed a new stadium. The new stadium was constructed on Viale Margherita (now Viale Giulio Cesare), replacing a hippodrome that once occupied the site. Construction of the new stadium took one year; it opened in 1928 and cost 3.5 million lire. The stadium was named after fascist Mario Brumana; this was common naming practice in fascist Italy. On 1 November 1928, Atalanta played its first unofficial match at the stadium (a 4–2 victory against Triestina); the stadium was then officially inaugurated on 23 December 1928, when Atalanta defeated La Dominante Genova 2–0 in front of over 14,000 spectators.

After World War II, the stadium was renamed the Stadio Comunale ("Municipal Stadium"), as fascism no longer existed in Italy. Expansion of the stadium began in the years following the war: the construction of a south stand (the Curva Sud) began in 1949, and a second stand at the north end (the Curva Nord) followed during the 1960s, opening in 1971. Later, in 1984, the running track was removed in order to expand the stadium's capacity upon Atalanta's return to Serie A after five years. The club's first match in the 1984–85 Serie A, a 1–1 draw against Inter, had an attendance of over 43,000 spectators, a record attendance for the Stadio Comunale.

The Tribuna Giulio Cesare underwent modernization during the early 1990s, and the stadium was renamed the Stadio Atleti Azzurri d'Italia ("Blue Athletes of Italy") in 1994. In 1997, following the death of 22-year-old forward Federico Pisani in a car accident, the Curva Nord was nicknamed the Curva Pisani in his honor. Similarly, the Curva Sud was nicknamed the Curva Morosini in 2012 to posthumously honor 25-year-old youth academy player Piermario Morosini, who died following collapse on the field during a Serie B match between Pescara and Livorno. In 2015, the stadium also expanded its side stands to offer pitchside views only several meters (feet) from the benches, a revolutionary feature of Italian stadiums at the time.

On 10 May 2017, Atalanta announced the acquisition of the stadium from the comune for 8.6 million euros, becoming one of only four Serie A clubs to own its home stadium. This acquisition allowed the club to authorize a renovation project for the stadium, for like many Italian stadiums, much of its structure and facilities were considered outdated. This renovation project was also necessary to upgrade the stadium to meet UEFA standards for hosting matches in UEFA competitions. Because the stadium was not ready at the time, Atalanta had to play its Europa League home matches at the Mapei Stadium in Reggio Emilia and its Champions League home matches in its debut season at San Siro in Milan. Despite not playing in Bergamo, though thanks to the additional capacity of San Siro, Atalanta recorded its record home attendance of 44,236 during a Champions League knockout stage match against Valencia on 19 February 2020.

Following a sponsorship agreement with electronics company Gewiss lasting at least until 2025, the stadium was renamed the Gewiss Stadium on 1 July 2019.  On 6 October 2019, the renovated Curva Nord was inaugurated for Atalanta's home match against Lecce; it has covered seating for over 9,000 spectators. A year later, both side stands underwent modernization and the Curva Sud had temporary seats installed on the concrete. These upgrades allowed Atalanta to play its Champions League matches in Bergamo starting in the 2020–21 season. The final phase will feature a rebuilt Curva Sud (mirroring the rebuilt Curva Nord), which will increase the stadium's capacity to about 25,000, as well as construction of a new underground parking garage and other improvements to the stadium's surroundings. It was originally expected to be completed in 2021, though was delayed until February or March 2022; the start of construction was then further delayed to spring 2024, with expected completion in August of that year. Atalanta will still be able to play its home matches at the Gewiss Stadium during construction.

The stadium in Bergamo has also been used as a home ground by local Serie C club AlbinoLeffe from 2003 to 2019 (when it moved to Gorgonzola), a period during which AlbinoLeffe spent nine years in Serie B and met Atalanta on several occasions. On occasion, Atalanta's youth team also plays competitive matches at the Gewiss Stadium, most recently the Supercoppa Primavera in 2021.

Training ground
The complex is used by the senior team for training and some friendlies, and the youth teams for training and home matches in youth competitions such as the Campionato Primavera 1. Atalanta's renowned youth academy (Scuola di Calcio; see below) is also based in Zingonia, and has been a continuous point of investment for the club since its establishment.

Supporters

, Atalanta is the 9th-most supported club in Italy, with an estimated 314,000 supporters. Although Atalanta supporters are vastly outnumbered in Italy by fans of more titled clubs, the club's performances in recent years have drawn additional support, especially among younger generations. An increase of 43% was reported since 2019, peaking at about 350,000 in 2021, and decreasing by 10% after the club failed to qualify for European competition in 2022. The club has also worked to grow its fanbase with the Neonati Atalantini initiative, implemented in 2010 by president Percassi, which gifts a free Atalanta replica shirt to all newborns born within the city limits of Bergamo. , over 36,000 shirts have been distributed; similar programs have been more recently adopted by other Italian clubs as well.

Most of the club's fans reside within the Province of Bergamo; conversely, there are very strong ties between Atalanta and Bergamo's residents, who often gather together in close-knit groups in support of the club. Atalanta supporters (tifosi) are considered to be among the most passionate and loyal fans in Italy. Atalanta's Ultras gather mostly in the Curva Nord as the unified group Curva Nord 1907, formed from members of various Ultras groups under the leadership of Claudio "Il Bocia" Galimberti during the early 2000s. The Curva Nord Ultras were historically leftist but are now apolitical. A separate Ultras group, Forever Atalanta, gathers in the Curva Sud, and is believed to still be leftist. Atalanta Ultras have a reputation as one of the most violent Ultras groups in Italy, self-describing as "we hate everybody", and indeed having few friends and many strong rivalries. The club and its Ultras have been punished on multiple occasions by the Italian Football League for violent or racist conduct.

On match days, the Curva Nord often features flares, fireworks, and choreography, and sometimes is covered by a large black-and-blue striped flag (see image). During the 2018–19 season, Atalanta matches had an average home attendance of 18,248, of whom an estimated 15,676 were season ticket holders.

Since 2002, Atalanta supporters have organized La Festa della Dea (the Festival of the Goddess), a multi-day festival to celebrate the club, almost every summer. The celebration features music, local cuisine, and reverence for the club's history, management, and players (both former and current players). Some contemporary players and coaches also have appeared at the celebration, most recently in 2018.

Friendships and rivalries
Atalanta supporters have a long-standing friendship (gemellaggio; twinning) with supporters of Ternana. The friendship between the two clubs' supporters is one of the oldest and strongest in Italy, persevering since the 1980s. Historically, both clubs' Ultras were brought together by shared political views, and they frequently visit the other club's Curva. Supporters of the club also have a historical twinning with supporters of German club Eintracht Frankfurt, a friendship similarly rooted in shared political views. There are also friendly relations between fans of Atalanta and fans of Spezia (since Atalanta's run in the European Cup Winners' Cup in 1988), Cosenza, Cavese, and Austrian club Wacker Innsbruck.

Atalanta supporters share their most intense  with supporters of nearby club Brescia. Meetings between the two clubs are sometimes known as the Derby Lombardo (Lombard Derby). This rivalry has its roots in a historical feud between Bergamo and Brescia dating back to the Middle Ages, beginning in 1126 when Bergamo expanded its territory by acquiring land put up for sale by Brescia; this led to a series of territorial disputes and armed conflicts between the two cities, among them the Battle of Cortenuova in 1237. Although armed conflict eventually ended and both cities were unified under the Kingdom of Italy in 1861, the cities' historical rivalry has defined the atmosphere of matches between Atalanta and Brescia for the entirety of the clubs' history. In 1993, tension between the clubs' supporters escalated further following a match (won 2–0 by Brescia) that was suspended three times due to violence in the stands, which resulted in over 20 spectators being hospitalized.

Since at least 1977, a heartfelt rivalry has existed between fans of Atalanta and Torino. There have been various altercations between the clubs' Ultras during matches between the clubs, though some fans share a mutual respect or consider each other "respected enemies". The Atalanta–Torino rivalry also gave rise to a short-lived friendship (lasting until the early 1980s) between supporters of Atalanta and Juventus—Torino's city rival—though Atalanta supporters now also consider Juventus a hated rival. In addition to Juventus, there are also strong rivalries between Atalanta and Italy's other well-supported clubs: Roma, Milan, Inter, Napoli, and Lazio, and Fiorentina. The rivalry between Atalanta and Roma emerged in 1984 after once-friendly relations between the two clubs' Ultras deteriorated. Milan and Atalanta have had a long-standing rivalry fueled by the friendship between fans of Brescia and Milan as well as a controversial episode during a Coppa Italia match in 1990 that infuriated the Atalanta fans. Matches between Inter and Atalanta have seen violence among Ultras since the early 1970s, fueled by political differences as well as the clubs' shared black and blue colors. Atalanta's rivalry with Lazio has been historically characterized by opposing political views—respectively far left against far right—though has greatly intensified following Lazio's Coppa Italia triumph over Atalanta in 2019. The rivalry between Atalanta and Fiorentina has intensified during Gian Piero Gasperini's tenure as Atalanta manager (also corresponding to Atalanta's qualification to European competitions); multiple tense episodes have occurred during and after matches between the two clubs. There are also strong rivalries between supporters of Atalanta and supporters of Bologna, Como (a regional rivalry since the 1980s), Genoa, Hellas Verona, Pisa, and Vicenza, as well as Croatian club Dinamo Zagreb.

Players

Current squad

Youth sector

Other players under contract

Out on loan

Retired numbers
12 – Dedication to fans, in particular for Curva Pisani ones
14 –  Federico Pisani, forward (1991–97) – posthumous honor
80 – , radio journalist.

Managers

Atalanta's current manager (head coach) is Gian Piero Gasperini, who assumed the role on 14 June 2016. The club has had a total of 59 managers (including player-managers, assistants acting as head coach, and caretaker managers) since the club hired its first professional coach, Cesare Lovati, in 1925. The club's longest-serving manager is Emiliano Mondonico, who oversaw 299 matches in all competitions—including a European Cup Winners' Cup and a UEFA Cup—in two spells (1987–90 and 1994–98). Current manager Gasperini, who led the club to its highest league finishes and UEFA Champions League qualification between 2019 and 2021, has the second-most appearances as manager in the club's history (291 ) and the longest uninterrupted tenure as Atalanta manager (six consecutive seasons). Stefano Colantuono, who was also manager on two occasions (2005–07 and 2010–15), is the manager with the most appearances in league matches (261, compared to 246 for Mondonico) and third-most appearances in total (281).

Coaching staff

Finances and ownership

Presidential history
Atalanta have had several presidents (chairmen) ( or ) over the course of their history. Some of them have been the main shareholder of the club. The longest-serving chairman is Ivan Ruggeri, who was relieved of his duties after he suffered a stroke in January 2008, being replaced by his son Alessandro who was named chairman of Atalanta in September 2008. Alessandro's father was unable to manage the team due to the consequences of the stroke.
In June 2010, after another relegation to Serie B, Alessandro Ruggeri sold his share of the club to Antonio Percassi, who became the new chairman of Atalanta.

Honours

League 
 Serie B
 Winners (6): 1927–28, 1939–40, 1958–59, 1983–84, 2005–06, 2010–11
 Serie C1
 Winners (1): 1981–82

Cups 
 Coppa Italia
 Winners (1): 1962–63

Divisional movements

UEFA club coefficient ranking

Youth system

The Atalanta youth system consists of four men's teams that participate in separate national leagues (Primavera, Allievi Nazionali A and B, and Giovanissimi Nazionali) and two that participate at a regional level (Giovanissimi Regionali A and B).

The first person who was committed to set up the Atalanta youth teams was Giuseppe Ciatto. Every organisational aspect was dealt with and resolved by him, and he also took care to train the various teams. In 1949 Atalanta won the Campionato Ragazzi.

In the late 1950s former Atalanta player Luigi Tentorio (then Special Commissioner of the club) felt the need to start investing more systematically in youth: he decided to create a real youth sector, with its own independent structure from the first team. The youth sector was entrusted to Giuseppe Brolis, who created a partnership with various clubs in the Veneto and Friuli regions, building a network of scouts and young coaches.

A crucial step in the history of the Bergamo youth sector took place in the early 1990s when the president Antonio Percassi implemented a new investment policy, especially at the youth level. He managed to convince Fermo Favini to leave Como and entrusted him with the responsibility of the youth sector.

The Atalanta youth system not only continued to increase the production of players for the first team, but began to win several honours in the most important national leagues. From 1991 to 2014, the various youth teams have won 17 national titles.

Apart from successes at youth level, the Atalanta youth system is also one of the most highly regarded in Europe: according to a ranking by the study centre in Coverciano, Atalanta have the top youth system in Italy and the sixth in Europe, behind Real Madrid, Barcelona and three French teams. The parameters used were the number of first division players produced by the club. In the 2007–08 season, 22 players from Atalanta's youth played in Serie A, 32 in Serie B and 3 abroad.

In 2014, a global study of the "CIES Football Observatory", placed the Atalanta youth system eighth place in the world, with 25 former youth players who play in the top 5 European leagues.

Notes

References

Bibliography

External links

 
Atalanta at Serie A 
Atalanta at UEFA
Official fans site 
Tutto Atalanta: Atalanta News & Gossip 

 
Sport in Bergamo
Football clubs in Lombardy
Association football clubs established in 1907
Italian football First Division clubs
Serie A clubs
Serie B clubs
Serie C clubs
Coppa Italia winning clubs
1907 establishments in Italy
2022 mergers and acquisitions